Dipchasphecia lanipes is a moth of the family Sesiidae. It is found in Bulgaria and Asia Minor.

The larvae possibly feed on Plumbaginaceae and/or Caryophyllaceae species.

References

Moths described in 1863
Sesiidae
Moths of Europe